Bulgarian Social Democratic Workers' Party (Narrow Socialists) was a Marxist, socialist political party in Bulgaria. The party's origins lays in 1903, after a split at the 10th Congress of the Bulgarian Workers' Social Democratic Party. The other faction formed the Bulgarian Social Democratic Workers Party (Broad Socialists).

History 
The party's leader was Dimitar Blagoev, the driving force behind the formation of the BSDWP in 1894. It comprised most of the hardline Marxists in the Workers' Social Democratic Party, which followed the doctrine of class struggle. This entailed concentrating on building the party amongst the industrial working class rather than creating a broader political framework which would also appeal to the peasantry. One feature of this was their proposal to confiscate all private property, which inhibited their electoral success.

In 1909 the Social Democratic Union 'Proletarian', which had been expelled from the Narrow Socialists, merged into the Broad Socialist party. At the Zimmerwald Conference, where the unraveling of the coalition between revolutionary socialists and reformist socialists in the Second International began, the party supported the so-called Zimmerwald Left. It opposed World War I and was sympathetic to the October Revolution in Russia. Under the influence of the Bolsheviks the narrow socialists accepted the ideas of Leninism. Under Blagoev's leadership, the party applied to join the Communist International in 1919. Upon joining the Comintern the party was reorganised as the Bulgarian Communist Party.

See also 
 Bulgarian Communist Party

References

1903 establishments in Bulgaria
1919 disestablishments in Bulgaria
Bulgarian Communist Party
Defunct political parties in Bulgaria
Political parties disestablished in 1919
Political parties established in 1903
Social democratic parties in Bulgaria